Zem can refer to:

 Zem, a character from Crash Bandicoot
 Nkong-Zem, a town and commune in Cameroon
 Roschdy Zem (born 1965), a French actor and filmmaker of Moroccan descent
 ZEM, a Portuguese Pop-Rock band
 Zem (mattress), a character in The Hitchhiker's Guide to the Galaxy by Douglas Adams
 ZEM, the IATA code for Eastmain River Airport, Quebec, Canada